The Cantabrian Sea is the term used mostly in Spain to describe the coastal sea of the Atlantic Ocean that borders the northern coast of Spain and the southwest side of the Atlantic coast of France, included in the Bay of Biscay. It extends from the cape Estaca de Bares in the province of A Coruña, to the mouth of the river Adour, near the city of Bayonne on the coast of the department of Pyrénées-Atlantiques in French Basque Country.

The sea borders  of coastline shared by the Spanish provinces of A Coruña, Lugo, Asturias, Cantabria, Biscay and Gipuzkoa, and the French area of Labourd.

Notes and references 

European seas
Seas of Spain
Seas of France
Marginal seas of the Atlantic Ocean
Bay of Biscay